The 2020 La Flèche Wallonne was a road cycling one-day race that was to have taken place on 22 April 2020 in Belgium, but was postponed due to the COVID-19 pandemic. It was rescheduled to 30 September, and it was the 84th edition of La Flèche Wallonne and part of the 2020 UCI World Tour. It was won by Marc Hirschi.

Teams
The teams that participated in the race were:

UCI WorldTeams

 
 
 
 
 
 
 
 
 
 
 
 
 
 
 
 
 
 
 

UCI Professional Continental teams

Result

References

La Fleche Wallonne
La Fleche Wallonne
La Fleche Wallonne
La Flèche Wallonne
La Fleche Wallonne